These Old Broads is a 2001 American comedy television film directed by Matthew Diamond, written by Carrie Fisher and Elaine Pope, and starring Fisher's mother Debbie Reynolds, as well as Shirley MacLaine, Joan Collins, and Elizabeth Taylor in her final film role. In a 2001 BBC Omnibus documentary about Taylor, MacLaine says that Julie Andrews and Lauren Bacall were originally planned to be in the film. The role of Miriam Hodges was originally offered to June Allyson, who ended up in a cameo instead.

Plot summary 
Network television executive Gavin hopes to reunite celebrated Hollywood stars Piper Grayson, Kate Westbourne, and Addie Holden in a TV special after their 1960s film musical Boy Crazy is re-released to wide public acclaim in the 1990s. Though the three women share the same agent, Beryl Mason, Gavin's seemingly insurmountable obstacle is that they all cannot stand one another.

Cast 
 Shirley MacLaine as Kate Westbourne
 Debbie Reynolds as Piper Grayson
 Joan Collins as Addie Holden
 Elizabeth Taylor as Beryl Mason
 Jonathan Silverman as Wesley Westbourne
 Pat Crawford Brown as Miriam Hodges (Addie's mother)
 Nestor Carbonell as Gavin
 Peter Graves as Bill
 Gene Barry as Mr. Stern
 Pat Harrington Jr. as Tony Frank
 Carlos Jacott as Tom
 Hinton Battle as Pete
 Suzanne Carney as Connie
 Heath Hyche as Ben Collier
 Betty Carvalho as Rosa
 Joe Sabatino as Leo
 Sheri Hellard as Laurie Miller
 Larry Sullivan as Jason (as Larry Sullivan Jr.)
 Todd Fisher as Timothy
 Tricia Leigh Fisher as Hooker
 Carrie Fisher as Hooker
 Zach Woodlee as Boy Crazy Dancer
 Kevin Alexander Stea as Boy Crazy Dancer (as Kevin Stea)
 Dante Henderson as Boy Crazy Dancer
 June Allyson as Lady in Hotel (uncredited)
 Kevin Nealon as Roger (uncredited)

Back story of leads 
MacLaine, Reynolds, Collins and Taylor had all crossed paths personally and/or professionally in Hollywood over the years. Collins dated MacLaine's brother, Warren Beatty, when he was just starting his film career. Collins was also put on standby to replace an ailing Taylor in the film Cleopatra but Taylor recovered from her illness and completed the film. Reynolds' husband, Eddie Fisher, left her for a grieving Taylor after his best friend and Taylor's husband, Mike Todd, was killed in a plane crash. Reynolds and Taylor had also been close friends before the affair, but they grew to hate each other due to what happened and stayed away for twelve years. However, the two eventually reconciled on a cruise ship in a plan set up by Carrie Fisher and once again remained friends until Taylor's death in 2011. MacLaine wanted the role of Molly Brown in The Unsinkable Molly Brown but a clause in her contract prevented her from getting it; this made the role available for Reynolds, who garnered an Oscar nomination for her performance in the film. MacLaine portrayed a character loosely based on Reynolds in Postcards from the Edge, written by Reynolds's daughter, Carrie Fisher.

The story of Kate Westbourne's adopted son Wesley Westbourne, who is actually her biological son from her affair with the late Dick Preston, may have been inspired by the true story of Loretta Young, Judy Lewis and Clark Gable.

References

External links

2001 television films
2001 films
2001 comedy films
2001 LGBT-related films
2000s American films
2000s buddy comedy films
2000s English-language films
2000s female buddy films
ABC network original films
American buddy comedy films
American comedy television films
American female buddy films
American LGBT-related television films
Films about actors
Films directed by Matthew Diamond
Films with screenplays by Carrie Fisher
Films scored by Guy Moon
Gay-related films
LGBT-related buddy comedy films